is a Japanese footballer who plays as a defensive midfielder for  club Sanfrecce Hiroshima.

Career statistics

Club

References

External links 
 

2000 births
Living people
Japanese footballers
Japan youth international footballers
Association football midfielders
J1 League players
J2 League players
Sanfrecce Hiroshima players
Omiya Ardija players
Zweigen Kanazawa players